is a Japanese former cyclist. He was eight times national road race champion, raced professionally in Europe, represented Japan at world track championships, and even became national champion in mountain biking. He competed at the 1988 Summer Olympics and the 1996 Summer Olympics, the first in the men's individual road race, the second in men's cross-country mountain biking. He won the second edition of the Tour de Okinawa in 1990. After retirement, he began coaching and served as a coach for the national team at the 2008 Summer Olympics.

Major results
1990
 1st Tour de Okinawa
1991
 1st  Road race, National Road Championships
1992
 1st  Road race, National Road Championships
2001
 5th Tour de Okinawa

References

External links

1961 births
Living people
Japanese male cyclists
Olympic cyclists of Japan
Cyclists at the 1988 Summer Olympics
Cyclists at the 1996 Summer Olympics
Cyclists at the 1986 Asian Games
Asian Games medalists in cycling
Asian Games silver medalists for Japan
Sportspeople from Saga Prefecture
Medalists at the 1986 Asian Games